First Bajamal cabinet was the cabinet of Yemen led by Yemeni prime minister Abdul Qadir Bajamal from 4 April 2001 to 16 May 2003.

List of ministers

See also 

 Politics of Yemen

References 

Cabinets of Yemen
First Bajamal Cabinet